Georges Constant Mandjeck (born 9 December 1988) is a Cameroonian professional footballer who plays as a midfielder for Cypriot club Nea Salamis.

Club career

Stuttgart
Mandjeck joined Stuttgart from Kadji Sports Academy in the summer of 2007 and made his competitive debut for the club on 25 July 2007 in their 2–0 home defeat to Bayern Munich in the semi-finals of the Premiere-Ligapokal, coming on as a substitute for Antônio da Silva in the 89th minute. It turned out to be his only competitive appearance for Stuttgart during the 2007–08 season.

Loan to Kaiserslautern

On 30 January 2008, Mandjeck was loaned out to 2. Bundesliga side 1. FC Kaiserslautern until the end of the season. He made his league debut for the club on 1 February 2008 in their 1–1 away draw at Borussia Mönchengladbach, starting the match and being replaced by Moussa Ouattara in the 67th minute. He went on to make a total of 10 league appearances for Kaiserslautern before returning to Stuttgart upon the end of the season.

Back at Stuttgart
Mandjeck's first competitive appearance since returning to Stuttgart came on 28 August 2008 in the club's 4–1 away win at Hungarian side Győri ETO FC in the second leg of the second qualifying round for the UEFA Cup, coming on as a substitute for Pável Pardo in the 63rd minute. He went on to make his Bundesliga debut on 13 September 2008 in Stuttgart's goalless draw away at 1899 Hoffenheim, coming off the bench to replace Khalid Boulahrouz in the 84th minute.

Second loan to Kaiserslautern
In July 2009, Mandjeck was again loaned to 1. FC Kaiserslautern until the end of the 2009–10 season. He made his first competitive appearance of the season on 31 July 2009 in Kaiserslautern's 1–0 win at Eintracht Braunschweig in the first round of the German Cup and also appeared in the club's opening league match of the season on 8 August 2009, a 2–1 win at home to Greuther Fürth, playing the full 90 minutes in both of these two games. He subsequently established himself as a regular at the club.

Stade Rennais
In July 2010, he moved to Stade Rennais F.C.

Auxerre
In January 2013, he moved to Auxerre.

Kayseri Erciyesspor
Mandjeck moved to Kayseri Erciyesspor at a fee of €4 million. He signed a contract until 2016.

Loan to Metz
On 11 January 2018, Sparta Prague loaned Mandjeck to Ligue 1 side FC Metz until the end of the season.

Waasland-Beveren
On 29 September 2020, Mandjeck joined Belgian Belgian First Division A side Waasland-Beveren.

Kocaelispor
On 8 July 2021, he signed with Kocaelispor in Turkey.

International career
Mandjeck was part of Cameroon's squad for the 2008 Summer Olympics. He came on as a substitute in their first group game against South Korea, where he scored a goal to earn Cameroon a 1–1 draw. He made his second appearance in the team's third group game, a goalless draw against Italy, where he was sent off for stamping on the foot of Antonio Nocerino.

Career statistics

International

Honours

International
Cameroon
Africa Cup of Nations: 2017

References

External links
 
 
 

1988 births
Footballers from Douala
Living people
Cameroonian footballers
Association football midfielders
Cameroon international footballers
Kadji Sports Academy players
VfB Stuttgart players
1. FC Kaiserslautern players
Stade Rennais F.C. players
AJ Auxerre players
Kayseri Erciyesspor footballers
FC Metz players
AC Sparta Prague players
Maccabi Haifa F.C. players
S.K. Beveren players
Kocaelispor footballers
Bundesliga players
2. Bundesliga players
Ligue 1 players
Ligue 2 players
Süper Lig players
Czech First League players
Israeli Premier League players
Belgian Pro League players
TFF First League players
Footballers at the 2008 Summer Olympics
Olympic footballers of Cameroon
2010 Africa Cup of Nations players
2010 FIFA World Cup players
2015 Africa Cup of Nations players
2017 Africa Cup of Nations players
2017 FIFA Confederations Cup players
2019 Africa Cup of Nations players
Cameroonian expatriate footballers
Expatriate footballers in Germany
Cameroonian expatriate sportspeople in Germany
Expatriate footballers in France
Cameroonian expatriate sportspeople in France
Expatriate footballers in Turkey
Cameroonian expatriate sportspeople in Turkey
Expatriate footballers in the Czech Republic
Cameroonian expatriate sportspeople in the Czech Republic
Expatriate footballers in Belgium
Cameroonian expatriate sportspeople in Belgium